The Birmingham South Stars were a professional ice hockey team in the Central Hockey League from 1982 to 1983. The South Stars were based out of Birmingham, Alabama at the Birmingham Jefferson Convention Center. Coached by Gene Ubriaco, the South Stars would lose in the Adams Cup Championship to the Indianapolis Checkers. Following the season, the team folded.

Notable players who played for the South Stars included Don Beaupre, Mario Lessard and Steve Carlson.

Season-by-season record
Note: GP = Games played, W = Wins, L = Losses, T = Ties, Pts = Points, GF = Goals for, GA = Goals against, PIM = Penalties in minutes

Central Hockey League

References

External links
 BirminghamProSports.com

Sports teams in Birmingham, Alabama
Defunct Central Hockey League teams
Ice hockey clubs established in 1982
Ice hockey teams in Alabama
Ice hockey clubs disestablished in 1983
Defunct ice hockey teams in Alabama
Central Professional Hockey League teams
1982 establishments in Alabama
1983 disestablishments in Alabama